The Laos–Vietnam border is the international border between the territory of Laos and Vietnam. The border is 2,161 km (1,343 m) in length and runs from the tripoint with China in the north to tripoint with Cambodia in the south.

Description
The border starts in the north at the tripoint with China and proceeds overland in a south-eastwards direction. It then turns to the west, briefly utilising the Nam Sam River, before turning sharply south-eastwards and following the Annamite Mountains and, for a period, the Sepon River, terminating at the Cambodian tripoint.

History

Historically the Annamite Range formed a natural boundary between Vietnamese kingdoms in the east and Lao, Thai and Khmer kingdoms in the west. From the 1860s France began establishing a presence in the region, initially in modern Cambodia and Vietnam, and the colony of French Indochina was created in 1887. Laos was at this point part of the Kingdom of Siam (the old name for Thailand), however it was annexed to French Indochina in 1893 following the Franco-Siamese War. The precise date of the delimitation of the frontier is unclear; the International Boundary Study states that "The juridical basis of the Laos–Viet-Nam boundary probably stems from ancient treaties and custom as modified or made more specific by decrees of the Indochinese administration." Part of the border was demarcated in 1916 following a dispute, and French maps were drawn up during the colonial period that were used as the basis for the later international border.

Laos obtained a partial independence from France in 1949, gaining complete independence in 1953, followed by Vietnam in 1954. Vietnam was however partitioned into North and South Vietnam separated by a Vietnamese Demilitarized Zone, with Laos bordering both entities. During the Vietnam War the border was crossed by Viet Cong supply lines, most notably the Ho Chi Minh Trail, causing it to be heavily bombed by American forces. Following the victory of the Communists in 1975 in both Vietnam and Laos, a border treaty was signed in 1976 based on the colonial-era border line. On the ground demarcation then took place from 1979 to 1984. Some small modification of the border were made in 1986.

Border crossings

There are several border crossings:
 Sop Hun (May, Phongsaly, Laos) – Tây Trang (Điện Biên district, Điện Biên province, Vietnam)
 Namsoi (Viengxay, Houaphanh, Laos) – Na Mèo (Quan Sơn, Thanh Hóa, Vietnam)
 Namkan (Nong Het, Xiangkhouang, Laos) – Nậm Cắn (Kỳ Sơn, Nghệ An, Vietnam)
 Namphao (Khamkeut, Bolikhamsai, Laos) – Cầu Treo (Hương Sơn, Hà Tĩnh, Vietnam)
 Naphao (Boualapha, Khammouane, Laos) – Cha Lo (Minh Hóa, Quảng Bình, Vietnam)
 Dansavan (Seponh, Savannakhet, Laos) – Lao Bảo (Hướng Hóa, Quảng Trị, Vietnam)
 Phoukeua (Phouvong, Attapeu, Laos) – Bờ Y (Ngọc Hồi, Kon Tum, Vietnam)

See also
 Laos–Vietnam relations

References

 
border
Borders of Vietnam
Borders of Laos
International borders